SLIT-ROBO Rho GTPase-activating protein 1 is an enzyme that in humans is encoded by the SRGAP1 gene.

References

Further reading